Velký Chlumec is a municipality and village in Beroun District in the Central Bohemian Region of the Czech Republic. It has about 400 inhabitants.

Administrative parts
The village of Malý Chlumec is an administrative part of Velký Chlumec.

References

Villages in the Beroun District